Morrone Stadium, officially known as Ray Reid Field at Joseph J. Morrone Stadium is the on-campus soccer stadium at University of Connecticut in Storrs, Connecticut.

The 5,100-seat stadium was built in 1969. and has undergone many renovations since. The stadium hosts the school's men's and women's soccer  programs.

History

Morrone Stadium was built in 1969, and was at the time known as Connecticut Soccer Stadium. Before that, UConn soccer was largely unknown and unpopular. However, at the urging of newly hired soccer and lacrosse coach Joe Morrone (whose name the stadium now bears), a new stadium was built for the team.  The stadium has had a capacity as high as 8,574 but it was restructured in 1994 and again in 2002 to seat 5,564. In 2008, it was again restructured to seat 4,407. In 2009, Morrone Stadium was expanded slightly to 4,500. As of the 2015 season the current capacity is 5,100. In 1997, the Board of Trustees voted to change the name of the stadium to honor  Morrone, who had just retired after coaching soccer for 28 years at UConn. The stadium was officially renamed in 1999 to Joseph J. Morrone Stadium. In 2008, the Division of Athletics proposed to build a new basketball practice facility on the site of Morrone, but that was later changed and it will now be built where the vacant Memorial Stadium now is.

Morrone Stadium was the original home of the women's lacrosse team as well, when it was founded in 1997. However, the team began to play some, and eventually all, of its games at the Sherman Family-Sports Complex. The last lacrosse game at Morrone was in 2009 against the Rutgers Scarlet Knights, which was the first time the team played there in three years.

Description

The listed capacity of Morrone Stadium is 5,100. There is one electronic scoreboard behind the south goal, which is capability of displaying the time, score and shots for both teams, as well as limited messages. The natural grass surface measures 120 x 75 yards. Long metal bleachers line both sides of the field, and there is also a small set of bleachers behind the south goal. There is also unofficially standing room behind the north goal, although this is typically only used by students in the "Goal Patrol", UConn soccer's student supporters group. The Goal Patrol is known for being one of the nation's loudest and most passionate student sections, and, as of 2007, was also the largest with 540 members. Thanks in large part to these loyal fans, Soccer America Magazine voted Morrone Stadium  the fifth-best atmosphere  among all college soccer stadiums in the country in 2011. Large crowds continue to attend UConn men's and women's games there, making it one of the toughest places for visiting teams to play.

Location

Like many of the University of Connecticut Athletic Facilities, Morrone Stadium is located on Stadium Road, right next to Mark Edward Freitas Ice Forum, which is home to the women's ice hockey team. It is also across the street from J.O. Christian Field, home of the baseball team. The softball field is nearby, as is the Werth Family UConn Basketball Champions Center and the Sherman Family Sports Complex. Gampel Pavilion, home to the men's and women's basketball teams and the women's volleyball team is located around the corner as well.

Men's soccer sellouts

Note: Attendance goes back to the 2007 Season. * designates an NCAA Division I men's soccer tournament game.

|}

New Stadium
On October 13, 2014 it was announced the former UConn men’s soccer student-athlete Tony Rizza ’87 (BUS) has pledged a total of $8 million to transform the soccer complex and build a new soccer stadium on the Storrs campus.  The new facility will be built on the site of the current Joseph J. Morrone Stadium and will bear the same name. In February 2017, UConn announced a proposed plan for a new stadium with the potential to break ground in the spring of 2018.

Notable events and Games

On September 26, 1999 6,070 fans attended the women's soccer game against the Syracuse Orangemen. At the time, this was a record for attendance at a regular season women's college soccer game. Additionally, Morrone Stadium has hosted various soccer tournaments. On November 11 and 13, 2005, Morrone Stadium hosted the 2005 Big East Soccer Tournament semifinals and finals. The regular-season co-champion Huskies defeated the South Florida Bulls 1-0. It also hosted the semifinals and final of the 2006 Big East Women's Tournament, the 2007 Big East Men'sTournament, and the 2009 Women's Big East Tournament. On February 9, 2011, the Big East Conference announced Morrone Stadium would again host the final two rounds of the Women's conference tournament in 2012, its first tournament in three years. However, as a result of logistical issues related to postponements caused by Hurricane Sandy, the tournament was moved to Rentschler Field in East Hartford. The stadium would later host the semifinals and final of the 2014 American Athletic Conference men's soccer tournament, where the Tulsa Golden Hurricane defeated USF 6-5 on penalty kicks after a scoreless draw. Morrone has also hosted several games of the opening rounds of the Big East, American Athletic Conference, and NCAA Tournaments for both sexes, although those are typically played at the site of the higher seed.

References

External links
 Information at UConn Facilities

Soccer venues in Connecticut
Sports venues in Tolland County, Connecticut
UConn Huskies soccer
UConn Huskies sports venues
Lacrosse venues in Connecticut